Elisabetta Vignotto (born 13 January 1954), nicknamed "Betty", is an Italian former footballer who played as a striker.

Club career 

At club level Vignotto represented numerous different clubs in Serie A. In 1986 she told la Repubblica: "So far I've changed teams ten times. But it's not that I'm capricious. The teams broke up." According to the Dizionario del Calcio Italiano, she scored 467 goals in 461 Serie A appearances.

She was the chairman of A.S.D. Reggiana Calcio Femminile (and later A.S.D. Sassuolo Calcio Femminile).

International career 

Vignotto reportedly scored 107 goals in 109 games for the Italian national team. FIFA suggest she made 110 appearances. The Italian Football Federation (FIGC) website does not support this, suggesting figures of 97 goals in 95 national team games.

Vignotto held the goalscoring record for women's international matches until May 1999, when she was surpassed by Mia Hamm, who scored her 108th goal for the United States.

She was inducted into the Italian Football Hall of Fame in 2017.

International goals

Honours

Club 
Gommagomma
 Serie A: 1970

Real Juventus
 Serie A: 1971

Gamma 3 Padova
 Serie A: 1972, 1973
 Coppa Italia: 1974

Valdobbiadene
 Serie A: 1976

Gorgonzola
 Coppa Italia: 1980

Reggiana
 Serie A: 1989–90

International 
Italy
 Mundialito: 1984, 1986

Individual 
 Serie A top scorer: 1971, 1972, 1973, 1974, 1980
 Italian Football Hall of Fame: 2017

References

See also 
 List of women's association football players with 100 or more international goals

1954 births
Living people
Italian women's footballers
Italy women's international footballers
People from San Donà di Piave
FIFA Century Club
Women's association football forwards
Italian football chairmen and investors
Serie A (women's football) players
A.S.D. Reggiana Calcio Femminile players
Sportspeople from the Metropolitan City of Venice
ACF Milan players
Roma Calcio Femminile players
Footballers from Veneto